Stewarts Point may refer to the following places in the United States:

 Stewarts Point, California
 Stewarts Point, Nevada

See also 
 Stewarts Point State Marine Reserve & Stewarts Point State Marine Conservation Area in Sonoma County, California
 Kashia Band of Pomo Indians of the Stewarts Point Rancheria in Sonoma County, California